Vital rates refer to how fast vital statistics change in a population (usually measured per 1000 individuals). There are 2 categories within vital rates: crude rates and refined rates.

Crude rates measure vital statistics in a general population (overall change in births and deaths per 1000).

Refined rates measure the change in vital statistics in a specific demographic (such as age, sex, race, etc.).

Ecology